Margaret Brennan (1 July 1831 – 23 August 1887), born in Kingston, Upper Canada, was known as Sister Teresa, and she became a member of the Sisters of St. Joseph in 1852. At that time, the order was just establishing itself in Canada.

Sister Teresa helped lay the foundation of the Sisters of St. Joseph in Ontario, which spread to the western provinces and the Northwest Territories. The sisters still serve in the fields of education, health care, and social work.

External links 
 Biography at the Dictionary of Canadian Biography Online

1831 births
1887 deaths
Canadian Roman Catholic religious sisters and nuns
Founders of Catholic religious communities
Pre-Confederation Ontario people
Sisters of Saint Joseph